Don Pati (born 24 May 1990) is a Samoan-born American professional rugby union player. He plays as a wing or full back for the Utah Warriors in Major League Rugby and previously for the USA Sevens team internationally.

Pati was born in Apia in Samoa and moved to the United States in 2004. He was educated at Hunter High School and the University of Utah.

In July 2021 he was named head coach of the University of Utah sevens team.

References

1990 births
Living people
Sportspeople from Apia
Samoan emigrants to the United States
American rugby union players
University of Utah alumni
Utah Warriors players
Rugby union fullbacks
Rugby union wings